Homeland is a 2019 Chinese military drama television series directed by Wang Xinjun and produced by Qin Hailu. It stars Wang Xinjun, Qin Hailu, Han Li, and Wang Wenqi. The series premiered on Beijing Television on November 6, 2019. The series focuses on the life of Wei Dahe, a commander of the Counter-Japanese Guerrillas, dies bravely to defend China during the Second Sino-Japanese War.

Cast

Main
 Wang Xinjun as Wei Dahe
 Qin Hailu as Jiang Yazhen
 Han Li as Gao Xiaoshan
 Wang Wenqi as Cui Gu

Supporting
 Li Xuejian as Wei Xiluo, father of Wei Dahe.
 Wei Qing as Mother
 Zhang Jiayi as Jian Xiuzhang
 Xin Baiqing as Fu Yang
 You Yong as Commander Song
 Liu Xiaoning as Commander Wei
 Shen Junyi as Jiang Huaizhu
 Wang Hui as Duan Dewu
 Zhao Liang as Fan Chengzhang
 Shi Zhaoqi as Division Commander Feng
 Sang Mingsheng as Ye Xianzhi
 Xu Leizhi as Xu Peizong
 Sun Dachuan as Li Daqiao
 Gao Xinsheng as Wang Sanxi
 Jin Tiefeng as Japanese military officer.

Soundtrack

Production
Shooting began on September 9, 2018 in Yuci, Shanxi and ended on April 3, 2019.

References

External links
 
 

2019 Chinese television series debuts
2019 Chinese television series endings
Chinese historical television series